Louis Diamond Phillips (born Upchurch; February 17, 1962) is a Filipino-American actor and film director. His breakthrough came when he starred as Ritchie Valens in the biographical drama film La Bamba (1987). For Stand and Deliver (1988), Phillips was nominated for a Golden Globe Award and won an Independent Spirit Award.

Phillips made his Broadway debut with the 1996 revival of The King and I, earning a Tony Award nomination for his portrayal of King Mongkut of Siam. Phillips' other notable films include Young Guns (1988), Young Guns II (1990), Courage Under Fire (1996), The Big Hit (1998), Brokedown Palace (1999), Che (2008), and The 33 (2015). In the television series Longmire, he played a main character named Henry Standing Bear. He played New York City Police Lieutenant Gil Arroyo on Prodigal Son on FOX from 2019 to 2021.

Early life
Phillips was born February 17, 1962, at the Subic Bay Naval Station in the Philippines, the son of Lucita Umayam Aranas and Gerald Amon Upchurch (1935–1963), a Marine KC-130 crew chief. His mother, a native of Candelaria, Zambales, is Filipina. His father was an American of Scots-Irish and Cherokee descent.

Phillips was named after the US Marine Leland "Lou" Diamond. After his father's death, he was adopted by his stepfather and his surname was changed to Phillips.

Phillips was raised in Texas. He graduated from Flour Bluff High School in Corpus Christi in 1980 and from the University of Texas at Arlington with a Bachelor of Fine Arts degree in Drama.

Career

1980s 
The first low-budget film in which he starred was called Trespasses. Phillips' big break came with the starring role in La Bamba (1987) in which he played early rocker Ritchie Valens. Prior to his cinematic breakthrough, he starred in the Miami Vice episode "Red Tape" (March 13, 1987), portraying detective Bobby Diaz.

In 1988, Phillips co-starred with Edward James Olmos in the inner-city high school drama Stand and Deliver, in a role for which he was nominated for the Golden Globe Award for Best Supporting Actor – Motion Picture and won the Independent Spirit Award for Best Supporting Male. He plays Angel David Guzman, a cholo gangster who is inspired by his math teacher, Jaime Escalante, to excel at calculus. Working to master the subject, he develops a friendship with his teacher. Stand and Deliver was filmed before La Bamba, but it was released a year later.

In 1988 Phillips co-starred with Emilio Estevez and Kiefer Sutherland in the Western film Young Guns, in which he plays Jose Chavez y Chavez, a historical Old West outlaw.

1990s 
In 1990, he revisited the role of Jose Chavez y Chavez in Young Guns II.

In the mid-1990s, Phillips was a vocalist with the Los Angeles-based rock group The Pipefitters.

In 1993, Phillips was among the guests on the Randy Travis television special Wind in the Wire.

In 1996, Phillips made his Broadway debut as the King in Richard Rodgers and Oscar Hammerstein II's The King and I.  Phillips won a Theatre World Award, and was nominated for both a Tony Award and a Drama Desk Award for his performance.

In 1998, he starred as Cisco, the counterpart of the main character Melvin Smiley (played by Mark Wahlberg) in the comedy-action film The Big Hit.

2000s 
He later featured a minor role in the TV sitcom George Lopez (2002–2004) as George Lopez's half-brother.
He also played a role in the first season of the TV series 24 as secret government agent Mark DeSalvo, opposite former Young Guns star Kiefer Sutherland.  Phillips played the recurring role of FBI agent Ian Edgerton in the television series Numb3rs.  Edgerton is an FBI tracker and sniper who works as an instructor at Quantico FBI Academy when he is not working a case in the field.  Phillips won the second season of the NBC reality series, I'm a Celebrity...Get Me Out of Here!, over pro wrestler Torrie Wilson. Phillips currently hosts the weekly series An Officer and a Movie on The Military Channel. This series features various theatrical World War II dramas, with discussion breaks during the film in which Phillips interviews members of the US military and intelligence communities about details of the events that inspired each film.

In 2003, he starred in a cameo role with Harrison Ford in an action-comedy film Hollywood Homicide.

On September 11, 2007, Phillips joined the touring troupe for Lerner and Loewe's Camelot in the role of King Arthur.

Phillips had a recurring role as Colonel Telford in the Stargate Universe television series during its two-season run on the SyFy channel 2009-2011. He played the would-be commander of the Destiny expedition, who is left behind when an accident launches an unsuspecting crew into deep space.  The commander works from Earth to bring the crew home, often coming into conflict with the shipborne command characters.

2010s 
In January 2012, he was one of eight celebrities participating in the Food Network reality series Rachael vs. Guy: Celebrity Cook-Off. On January 29, 2012, he was announced as the winner with a Zagat score of 28 out of 30, thereby winning $50,000 for his charity.

In June 2012, Phillips began co-starring in the television series Longmire, about a modern-day sheriff played by Robert Taylor. Phillips played Henry Standing Bear, a Native American, who is Longmire's best friend, often helping him with cases and in dealing with the reservation police who do not respect or like outsiders, especially other law enforcement.

In December 2012, he was featured in Imagine Dragons' music video for "Radioactive", which went on to eclipse 1 billion views on YouTube.In February 2013, Phillips appeared as star of the comedy short film Lucy in the Sky with Diamond, playing a hyperbolized version of himself known as the elusive and mysterious LDP—a renegade, spirit guide, and life coach who attempts to help John (John Patrick Jordan) get over a particularly disconcerting ex-girlfriend. The award-winning short was written and directed by Joey Boukadakis.

In July 2014, he replaced the injured Jason Scott Lee in Opera Australia's Melbourne production of The King and I, reprising his role as the King of Siam, playing opposite Lisa McCune as Anna Leonowens.

In 2014, he also guest-starred in The Wiggles Rock and Roll PreSchool DVD and made guest appearances on their TV program on ABC.

In 2016, Philips portrayed serial killer Richard Ramirez in The Night Stalker.

Radio
Phillips starred in four episodes of the radio series The Twilight Zone: Vol. 1, "A Kind of a Stopwatch"; Vol. 3, "The Parallel; Vol. 10, "Miniature"; and Vol. 12, "Long Live Walter Jameson".

Writing
Phillips co-wrote the screenplay for Trespasses and HBO's Dangerous Touch, and wrote the Miramax feature Ambition. In 2019 Aethon Books announced that it would be publishing Phillips' debut novel, Tinderbox: Soldier of Indira, a science fiction retelling of the Hans Christian Andersen story of the same name, illustrated by his wife, Yvonne.

Poker
Phillips has been a regular poker player since college. In May 2009, Phillips placed 31st of 403 entrants in the 2009 California State Poker Championship Limit Texas hold 'em. He cashed in the $10,000 July 2009 World Series of Poker World Championship No Limit main event. In a field of 6,494, he was eliminated in the phase from 407 to 185. He started the day in 114th place among the 407 and was busted on the final hand of the day finishing in 186th place and earning $36,626.

Personal life

Relationships and family
During the making of Trespasses, he met Julie Cypher, an assistant director. They married on September 17, 1987 and divorced on August 5, 1990. After their divorce, Cypher came out as lesbian and began a long-term relationship with Melissa Etheridge.

On the set of the film Shadow of the Wolf (1992), he met Jennifer Tilly to whom he was briefly engaged.

In 1994, he married makeup artist Kelly Preston, with whom he has three daughters: Grace and Isabella (twins born in October 1997), and Lili born in September 1999. They separated in 2003 and their divorce was finalized in July 2007, due to a difficult mediation.

Phillips began dating makeup artist Yvonne Boismier in 2004. He was charged with domestic battery against her in 2006. They married in August 2007 and their daughter, Indigo, was born in October 2007. They are partners on writing and illustrating Lou's first published novel.

Legal troubles
On August 11, 2006, Phillips was arrested for disturbing the peace at his Los Angeles home following loud noises coming from the house he shared with his live-in girlfriend and future wife, Yvonne Boismier. In December 2006, he pleaded no contest to a misdemeanor count of disturbing the peace and was sentenced to three years of probation.

On November 3, 2017, Phillips was arrested in Portland, Texas, after stopping his vehicle to ask a police officer for directions while intoxicated. He was charged with reckless driving. Phillips was released after posting bail. In April 2018, following a plea deal, Phillips was sentenced to two years of probation.

Activism

Phillips serves on the advisory council of The Coalition of Asian Pacifics in Entertainment, an organization that "champions diversity by educating, connecting, and empowering Asian American and Pacific Islander artists and leaders in entertainment and media."

Indian Country Today has reported that Phillips is part Cherokee on his father's side. He has remained close to the Native American community and was adopted by an Oglala Lakota Sioux family in a traditional ceremony in 1991. His Lakota name translates to "Star Keeper". In 1990, Phillips organized a concert called "The Winds of Life" to benefit Native American causes.

Phillips is also a member of the Canadian charity Artists Against Racism. In 2020, he appeared in the NoH8 LGBTQ equality campaign.

Awards and achievements
 1989 – Independent Spirit Award for Best Supporting Male (Stand and Deliver, 1988)
 1989 – Golden Globe Award nominee for Best Supporting Actor – Motion Picture (Stand and Deliver, 1988)
 1989 – Western Heritage Award Bronze Wrangler Theatrical Motion Picture (Young Guns, 1988). Shared with John Fusco (producer), Christopher Cain (producer), Charlie Sheen (actor), Emilio Estevez (actor), Kiefer Sutherland (actor)
 1993 – Oxfam America award for his dedication toward ending world hunger
 1994 – Houston International Film Festival Gold award for Best Theatrical Feature Film for Ultimate Revenge
 1996 – Tony Award nominee for Best Actor on Broadway (The King And I)
 1996 – Theater World Award: The King and I
 1996 – New York Outer Critics Circle: Outstanding Broadway Debut Award of an Actor, The King & I
 1997 – Blockbuster Entertainment Award for Favorite Supporting Actor – Adventure/Drama (Courage Under Fire, 1996)
 1997 – Lone Star Film & Television Award for Best Supporting Actor (Courage Under Fire, 1996)
 2001 – Filipinas magazine "Achievement award for Entertainment"
 2003 – Cinemanila Film Festival Lifetime Achievement Award (Philippines)
 2005 – Asia Pacific Islander Heritage Award for Excellence in Entertainment and Arts
 2009 – I'm a Celebrity... Get Me Out of Here!: King of the Jungle
 2012 – Rachael vs. Guy: Celebrity Cook-Off: Winner

Filmography

Film

Television

References

External links

 
 Lou Diamond Phillips BLVD (showcases the life and career of the actor since 1999)
 
 
 
 
 Lou Diamond Phillips Hendon Mob poker tournament results

1962 births
Living people
Male actors from Texas
American film directors of Filipino descent
American people of Chinese descent
 Cherokee Nation artists
American people of Scotch-Irish descent
American people of Spanish descent
American male actors of Filipino descent
American male film actors
American male screenwriters
American male television actors
American television directors
Film directors from Texas
Hispanic and Latino American male actors
I'm a Celebrity...Get Me Out of Here! winners
Independent Spirit Award for Best Supporting Male winners
Native American male actors
People from Corpus Christi, Texas
People from Zambales
Screenwriters from Texas
Theatre World Award winners
University of Texas at Arlington alumni